Albanian's Got Talent (also known as Ti Vlen) was an Albanian talent show. Albanian's Got Talent was the new name of Ti Vlen, which was stopped in 2009. Albanians Got Talent first aired on 15 October 2010. The judges were Altin Basha, Rovena Dilo and Armend Rexhepagiqi. The winners of the first season were Fiqiri Luli and Sabrina Troushku. It was primarily catered towards Albanians from Albania, Kosovo and North Macedonia.

Season 1, 2010

The first season of Albanians Got Talent, started on 15 October, and was hosted by Albana Osmani, a famous Albanian presenter, and Benet Kaci, a former presenter in RTK from Kosovo. The judges of the show were Altin Basha (director of the Albanian sitcom, Portokalli), Rovena Dilo (Albanian singer) and Armend Rexhepagiqi (Kosovo-Albanian).

External links
 Albanians Got Talent, Official Website

References

 
Television series by Fremantle (company)
Top Channel original programming
2010 Albanian television series debuts
2010 Albanian television series endings
Albanian reality television series
Non-British television series based on British television series